Jane Ellen Beaulieu is a New Hampshire politician.

Early life
Jane Beaulieu was born in Manchester, New Hampshire. Jane's father was Emile Beaulieu, former state legislator and mayor of Manchester.

Career
Beaulieu is a licensed cosmetologist. She is a small business owner. Beaulieu was an unsuccessful candidate the 2003 Manchester Mayoral Election. Beaulieu served as a member of the New Hampshire House of Representatives where she represented the Hillsborough 17 district from 2004 to 2010.

On November 6, 2012, Beaulieu was elected to the New Hampshire House of Representatives where she represents the Hillsborough 45 district. She assumed office on December 5, 2012. She is a Democrat.

Personal life
Beaulieu resides in Manchester. She is divorced, has one daughter, and one grandson.

References

Living people
Politicians from Manchester, New Hampshire
Women state legislators in New Hampshire
Democratic Party members of the New Hampshire House of Representatives
21st-century American politicians
21st-century American women politicians
Year of birth missing (living people)